The 2014–15 National Basketball League (Czech Republic) season was the 22nd season of the Czech NBL. The season started on September 22, 2014 and ended on May 20, 2015. ČEZ Nymburk won its 12th title in a row, runners-up Děčín were defeated 3–0 in the Finals.

Regular season

Results

Rounds 1-22

Rounds 23-42

Playoffs

Czech clubs in European competitions

Czech clubs in Regional competitions

External links
NBL official website 

Czech Republic
Basketball
National Basketball League (Czech Republic)